Fox Chase is a home rule-class city in Bullitt County, Kentucky, in the United States. It was formally incorporated by the state assembly in 1983. The population was 447 at the 2010 census.

Geography
Surrounding communities include the city of Hillview, with land to the north, southeast, and west; the city of Hebron Estates to the east; and unincorporated Brooks to the west of I-65.

Demographics

As of the census of 2000, there were 476 people, 176 households, and 162 families residing in the city. The racial makeup of the city was 99.79% White, and 0.21% from two or more races.

There were 176 households, out of which 27.8% had children under the age of 18 living with them, 87.5% were married couples living together, 2.8% had a female householder with no husband present, and 7.4% were non-families. 6.8% of all households were made up of individuals, and 2.3% had someone living alone who was 65 years of age or older. The average household size was 2.70 and the average family size was 2.81.

In the city the population was spread out, with 19.1% under the age of 18, 7.8% from 18 to 24, 19.5% from 25 to 44, 46.4% from 45 to 64, and 7.1% who were 65 years of age or older. The median age was 47 years. For every 100 females, there were 102.6 males. For every 100 females age 18 and over, there were 107.0 males.

The median income for a household in the city was $73,750, and the median income for a family was $75,790. Males had a median income of $50,781 versus $32,250 for females. The per capita income for the city was $30,371. None of the population or families were below the poverty line.

References

External links
City of Fox Chase official website

Cities in Bullitt County, Kentucky
Cities in Kentucky
Populated places established in 1983
1983 establishments in Kentucky